Thala mirifica is a species of small sea snail, marine gastropod mollusk in the family Costellariidae, the ribbed miters.

Description
The length of the shell attains 9 mm.

Distribution
This marine species occurs off the Philippines..

References

 Souverbie, M. (1876). Descriptions d'espèces nouvelles de l'archipel calédonien (23e article). Journal of Conchology, 24: 376-381. London
 Turner, Gori & Salisbury. (2007) - Costellariidae (Gastropoda) of the Maldive Islands, with descriptions of nine new species;  Vita Malacologica, supplement to Basteria 5:1–48-page(s): 37

External links
 Reeve, L. A. (1844-1845). Monograph of the genus Mitra. In: Conchologia Iconica, or, illustrations of the shells of molluscous animals, vol. 2, pl. 1-39 and unpaginated text. L. Reeve & Co., London

Costellariidae
Gastropods described in 1845